Doboj  is a city located in Republika Srpska, an entity of Bosnia and Herzegovina. It is situated on the banks of Bosna river, in the northern region of the Republika Srpska. As of 2013, it has a population of 71,441 inhabitants.

Doboj is the largest national railway junction and the operational base of the Railways Corporation of Bosnia and Herzegovina is located in Doboj. It is one of the oldest cities in Bosnia and Herzegovina and the most important urban center in northern Republika Srpska.

Geography
Prior to the war in Bosnia the municipality of the same name had a larger surface area. The largest part of the pre-war municipality is part of the Republika Srpska, including the city itself, (the Doboj Region). The southern rural areas are part of the Zenica-Doboj Canton of the Federation of Bosnia and Herzegovina, and the eastern rural part of the municipality is part of the Tuzla Canton, also in the Federation of Bosnia and Herzegovina. The parts of the pre-war Doboj Municipality that are in the Federation of Bosnia and Herzegovina are the municipalities of Doboj South (Doboj Jug) and Doboj East (Doboj Istok) and the Municipality of Usora. The northern suburbs of Doboj extend into the Pannonian plains, and effectively mark the southern tip of this great Central European plain. The southern (Doboj-South) and eastern suburbs (Doboj-East) are spread on the gentle hills which extend to larger Central Bosnian mountain areas (Mt. Ozren in south-east, Mt. Krnjin in the west).

History

Ancient times

Doboj was continuously inhabited ever since Neolithic times. Fragments of pottery and decorative art were found on several localities, with the most known site in Makljenovac, south from the city proper, at the confluence of rivers Usora and Bosna. Archeological findings from the paleolithic era were found in the cave at the Vila suburb.

The Illyrian tribe of Daesitates settled in this region as early as the twelfth century BC. Daesitates were one of the largest and most important Illyrian tribes residing at the territory of modern Bosnia and Herzegovina, sharing their northern borders with Breuci, another important tribe. Daesitates and Breuci started Great Illyrian Revolt, or in Roman sources, widespread rebellion known as Bellum Batonianum (6–9 AD). After the bloody rebellion was subdued, Roman legions permanently settled in the area and built the large military camp (Castrum) and civilian settlement (Canabea) in Makljenovac. These structures were most likely built in the early Flavian dynasty era, during Vespasian's rule.

The military camp was large and in the shape of near perfect rectangle with large towers at each corner and the main gate in the middle of the central wall and served as the most important defense on the old Roman road from Brod to Sarajevo, demarcating the very borders or Roman provinces Dalmatia and Pannonia.  It served its role for several centuries with the evidence of Belgian and Spanish cohorts stationed there in second and third century AD. Canabea contained Roman settlers, with evidence of a large bathhouse with a hypocaust (central heating) and a concubine house for soldiers stationed at nearby Castrum.  A large Villa Rustica was located at today's suburb of Doboj, appropriately named Vila. Very fine pieces of religious and practical applications were found at these sites, including an altar dedicated to God Jupiter, figurines of God Mars, and fragments of African made Tera sigillata pottery. When South Slavic tribes migrated into this area in sixth and seventh century AD, they have settled initially on the ruins of previous Roman settlement and lived there continuously until early thirteenth century at which point they used stones and building material from the old Roman Castrum in order the built the stone foundation of fortress Gradina, several kilometers due north, at today's old town Doboj.  Only the walls of former camp and civilian settlement are still visible to visitors today.

Middle Ages

The first official mention of the city itself is from 1415, as it was written in the charter issued by Dubrovnik to Holy Roman Emperor Sigismund, although there are numerous artefacts and objects that have been found (the National Museum of Bosnia and Herzegovina in Sarajevo and the Regional Museum in Doboj) and which confirm the fact that the area had been inhabited ever since the early Stone Age, and that the Roman Empire had an army camp (Castrum) and a settlement (Canabea) in the vicinity of the town dating from the first century AD. Following the arrival of the Slavs in the sixth century it became a part of the region/bannate Usora (in the medieval documents sometimes put together with the nearby province Soli, hence, Usora and Soli).

The Doboj fortress, a royal Kotromanić fortress, was first built in the early thirteenth century and then expanded in the early fifteenth century (1415). It was expanded again during the Ottoman Empire in 1490. This newer stone foundation of the fortress was built on previous layers of older foundation (dating to the ninth or tenth centuries) made of wood, mud and clay (Motte and Bailey type). It was a very important obstacle for invaders coming from the north, Hungarians, and later on, Austrians and Germans. It was built in the Gotho-Roman style with Gothic towers and Romanesque windows. The area saw numerous battles in medieval times and the fortress often changed hands between Bosnian and Hungarian armies. Doboj was the site of a particularly major battle between the Hungarians and a Bosnian-Turkish coalition in early August 1415 in which the Hungarians were heavily defeated on the field where the modern city of Doboj lies today (especially around the Makljenovac and Usora areas). As an important border fortress between the Bosnian Kingdom and Hungary it was also frequently attacked, officially recorded as 18 times, in the Austro-Ottoman Wars, and finally fell to the Habsburgs in 1878.

World War I and World War II

During World War I, Doboj was the site of the largest Austro-Hungarian concentration camp. According to its official figures, it held, between 27 December 1915 and 5 July 1917:

 16,673 men from Bosnia and Herzegovina
 16,996 women and children from Bosnia and Herzegovina (mostly of Serb ethnicity)
 9,172 soldiers and civilians (men, women, children) from the Kingdom of Serbia
 2,950 soldiers and civilians from the Kingdom of Montenegro

In total, 45,791 persons. Some 12,000 people have died in this camp, largely due to malnutrition and poor sanitary conditions.

By February 1916, the authorities began redirecting the prisoners to other camps. The Serbs from Bosnia were mostly sent to Győr (Sopronyek, Šopronjek/Шопроњек).

Most of the interned from Bosnia were whole families from the border regions of eastern Bosnia and Herzegovina. It is said that 5,000 families alone were uprooted from the Sarajevo district in eastern Bosnia along the border with the Kingdoms of Serbia & Montenegro.

From 1929 to 1941, Doboj was part of the Vrbas Banovina of the Kingdom of Yugoslavia.

During World War II, Doboj was an important site for the partisan resistance movement. From their initial uprising in August 1941 up until the end of the war, the Ozren partisan squad carried out numerous diversions against the occupation forces, among the first successful operations in Bosnia and Herzegovina. The city was an important stronghold for permanently stationed Ustasha and Domobran garrisons with smaller German units serving as liaison and in defense of important roads and railroads. Waffen SS "Handschar" division was partly mobilized from the local Muslim population and participated in battles around Doboj in the summer and the fall of 1944.

During this time, the Ustaša fascist regime, a puppet state of Nazi Germany, purged primarily ethnic Serbs, Jews and Roma, as well as pro-Partisan civilians to concentration and labor camps. According to public records 291 civilians from Doboj, of various ethnic backgrounds, perished in the Jasenovac concentration camp. In 2010, the remains of 23 people killed by Yugoslav Partisans were found in two pits near the Doboj settlement of Majevac. The non-governmental organization which discovered the remains alleges that nearby pits contain the remains of hundreds more also killed by the Partisans.

Doboj with its surrounding area, mountains Ozren and Trebava, was also a particularly important site for the local Chetnik armed forces. They participated in battles against Ustasha, Domobrans, and Germans initially together with local Partisan units and then alone, after the split with Partisans in April 1942. In November 1944, the elements of Ozren Chetnik Corps and Trebava Chetnik Corps partook in the Operation Halyard, the largest US rescue mission behind enemy lines. They built an airstrip in village Boljanici from which rescued US Airmen flew to safety to Bari, Italy. 

The town was eventually liberated by Yugoslav Partisans on 17 April 1945. The units involved were 14th Central-Bosnian Brigade and 53rd Division.

SFR Yugoslavia
The city was flooded in May 1965. During this period, the city experienced mass industrialization, becoming one of the most important industrial hubs in Yugoslavia.

Bosnian War

Doboj was strategically important during the Bosnian War. In May 1992, the control of Doboj was held by Bosnian Serb forces and the Serb Democratic Party took over the governing of the city. What followed was a mass disarming and subsequently mass arrests of all non-Serb civilians (namely Bosniaks and Croats).

Doboj was heavily shelled throughout the entire war by local Bosniak and Croatian forces. More than 5,500 shells, mortar rounds, and other projectiles were fired into the city proper and some 100 civilians were killed and more than 400 were wounded and maimed during the indiscriminate shelling.

A number of instances of war crimes and ethnic cleansing were committed by Bosnian Serb forces. Biljana Plavšić, acting individually or in concert with Radovan Karadžić, Momčilo Krajišnik and others, planned, instigated, ordered, committed or otherwise aided and abetted the planning, preparation or execution of the destruction of the Bosniaks and Bosnian Croats. She was charged with crimes against humanity that include but are not limited to the killings in Doboj. Plavšić's indictment was related to genocide charges in Doboj specifically.

Bosnian Serb forces were implicated in the systematic looting and destruction of Bosniak and Croat properties during the Bosnian War. A number of women were raped and civilians tortured or killed. All the mosques in town were destroyed. A number of mass executions took place in Spreča Centra Prison, on the banks of the river Bosna and in the "July 4th" military barrack in the village of Miljkovac, all in 1992. Many of the non-Serbs were detained at various locations in the town, subjected to inhumane conditions, including regular beatings, torture and forced labour. A school in Grapska and the factory used by the Bosanka company that produced jams and juices in Doboj was used as a rape camp. Four different classes of soldiers were present at the rape camps, including the local Serbian militia, the Yugoslav army (JNA), police forces based in the Serbian-occupied town of Knin and members of the White Eagles paramilitary group. The man who oversaw the women's detention in the school was Nikola Jorgić, a former police officer in Doboj, who has been convicted of genocide in Germany but died during the serving of his life sentence.

After the Dayton Agreement and the peace following in Bosnia and Herzegovina, the city served as a major HQ/base for IFOR (later SFOR) units.

The courts of Bosnia and Herzegovina are currently processing several cases for other war crimes in Doboj.

2014 floods
In May 2014, Doboj was the city in Bosnia and Herzegovina that accounted for the most damage and casualties during and following the historic rainfall that caused massive flooding and landslides, taking the lives of at least 20 people in Doboj alone.

Throughout the two weeks after the beginning of the natural disasters, the corpses of victims were still being found on streets, in homes and automobiles. On 26 May 2014, it was announced that the floods and landslides had uncovered mass graves with the skeletal remains of Bosniak victims of the Bosnian War of the 1990s. The mass graves are located in the Usora Municipality and the exact number of victims is as of yet unknown.

Demographics

Population

Ethnic composition

Urban area by settlements (1991) 

Bare:  732 (62%) Serbs, 153 (13%) Yugoslavs, 135 (11%) Croats, 112 (9%) Bosniaks, 53 (4%) others, 1,185 total
Centar:  3,720 (35%) Serbs, 3,365 (31%) Bosniaks, 1,982 (18%) Yugoslavs, 1,236 (12%) Croats, 432 (4%) others, 10,735 total
Čaršija: 3,561 (72%) Bosniaks, 594 (12%) Yugoslavs, 303 (6%) Serbs, 195 (4%) Croats, 273 (6%) others, 4,926 total
Doboj Novi: 358 (48%) Bosniaks, 237 (32%) Serbs, 39 (5%)  Yugoslavs, 7 (1%) Croats, 108 (14%) others, 749 total
Donji Grad:  1,879 (37%) Serbs, 1,547 (31%) Bosniaks, 844 (17%) Yugoslavs, 569 (11%) Croats, 196 (4%) others, 5,035 total
Orašje: 1,411 (66%) Bosniaks, 293 (14%) Serbs, 231 (11%) Yugoslavs, 111 (5%) Croats, 90 (4%) others, 2,136 total
Usora: 924 (33%) Serbs, 779 (28%) Bosniaks, 502 (18%) Croats, 491 (17%) Yugoslavs, 117 (4%) others, 2,813 total

Economy

As a rail hub, before the Bosnian War, Doboj focused much of its industrial activities around it. Moreover, as a regional center, it was home to several factories, now mostly bankrupt from mismanagement or privatized, including "Bosanka Doboj", a fruit and vegetable product factory; "Trudbenik", a maker of air compressors and equipment, etc. Nowadays, most of the economy, similar to the rest of the country and typical of poorly executed transition from state-controlled to a market economy, is based around the service industry. High unemployment warrants a vibrant coffee shop and bar scene, crowded throughout most of the day and night (it is commonly believed that Doboj is one of the top three cities having the largest number of coffee bars/pubs within city limits in Bosnia & Herzegovina).

In 1981, Doboj's GDP per capita was 53% of the Yugoslav average.

On the positive side, an approximately $800 million investment, due for groundbreaking during 2008 in the Stanari suburb, will start with the building of an electrical power plant. Additionally, the $1 billion investments in the northern Modriča Oil Refinery are likely to increase railroad traffic.

Economic preview

The following table gives a preview of total number of registered people employed in legal entities per their core activity (as of 2018):

Transportation
The city is the region's primary railroad junction, going south to Ploče on the Adriatic Sea, west to Banja Luka and Zagreb, north to Vinkovci, Croatia, and east to Tuzla, Bijeljina and Zvornik. The route of the future E-75 highway is supposed to pass through the Doboj area, and a separate highway toward western RS and Banja Luka has been completed and opened in 2018.

Society

Education
Doboj hosts the private Slobomir P University branch, with several colleges like
Faculty of information technology;
Faculty of economics and management;
Faculty of philology; Faculty of law;
Fiscal Academy and Academy of Arts. Doboj also seats the Mechanical and Electrical Engineering Technical School, as well as several specialized High Schools.

Doboj also hosts the public Faculty of Transport and Traffic Engineering, a branch of University of East Sarajevo with several departments: Road & Urban Transport; Rail Transport; Postal Transport; Telecommunication and Logistics. Since 2015/2016. academic year, they opened new departments: Air Transport; Roads; Informatics in Transport and Motor vehicles.

Sport

The local football club, Sloga Doboj, plays in the First League of the Republika Srpska.  The town's favourite sports activity, however, is handball.  It is being played by the local club Sloga Doboj. Sloga Doboj ranks among the country's top teams and consistently qualifies for international competitions. Very importantly, Doboj traditionally hosts "The Annual Doboj International Champions' Handball Tournament" every year during the last days of August. The year 2023 will see its 55th tournament and once again, the very best European handball teams will fight for the title of the Tournament's Winner. The prestige of this EHF-listed tournament was consistently strong enough to attract the most important names in the European team handball over the past five decades such as: Barcelona, Grasshopper, Gummersbach, Ademar León, CSKA, Steaua, Dinamo București, Atlético Madrid, Red Star, Metaloplastika, Partizan, Pelister, Nordhorn, Pick Szeged, Veszprém, Göppingen, Montpellier, d'Ivry and Chekhovski Medvedi.

Symbol
The four squares represent the four mountains which mark the outer borders of Doboj valley in which the City of Doboj lies in: Ozren, Trebava, Vučjak, and Krnjin. The fleur-de-lis represent the medieval origins of the city in the royal fortress Gradina built by the kings from the medieval Bosnian dynasty of Kotromanić.

Notable places
 The Doboj Fortress from the early thirteenth century, looking over the town.
 A Roman military camp (Castrum) from the first century AD (right above the confluence of the Usora and the Bosna rivers)
 Goransko Jezero, lake and recreation park in the vicinity of town.

Notable people

Aleksandar Đurić, Singapore footballer
Bojan Šarčević, basketball player
Borislav Paravac, politician
Danijel Pranjić, Croatian footballer
Danijel Šarić, Bosnian-Qatari handball player
Dina Bajraktarević, singer
Dino Djulbic, Australian footballer
Dragan Mikerević, politician
Fahrudin Omerović, footballer
Igor Vukojević, singer
Indira Radić, singer
Izet Sarajlić, historian
Jasmin Džeko, footballer
Krešimir Zubak, politician
Mirsada Bajraktarević, singer
Nenad Marković, basketball player
Ognjen Kuzmić, Serbian basketball player
Pero Bukejlović, politician
Sejad Halilović, former footballer
Silvana Armenulić, singer
Spomenko Gostić, soldier
Vladimir Tica, Serbian basketball player
Vlastimir Jovanović, footballer
Zoran Kvržić, footballer
Aidin Mahmutović, footballer
Zdenko Križić, Croatian Roman Catholic prelate
Benjamin Burić, handball goalkeeper
Senjamin Burić, handballer

Twin towns – sister cities

Doboj is twinned with:
 Celje, Slovenia (1965)
 Ćuprija, Serbia

References

External links
 Službene strane Grada Doboj
 Bhtourism.ba
 Dobojskatvrdjava.rs.ba 

 
Populated places in Doboj
Municipalities of Republika Srpska